McDonald's Philippines, known locally and colloquially as McDo, is the master franchise of the multinational fast food chain McDonald's in the Philippines. The master franchise is held by the Golden Arches Development Corporation, a subsidiary of Alliance Global Group.

History

Negotiations
McDonald's was introduced in the Philippines by Chinese-Filipino businessman George T. Yang, who resided in the United States in the 1970s, though he never patronized a McDonald's outlet during his stay. Aware of the fast food chain's success in North America and its increasing presence in other parts of the world, Yang researched fast-food business operations; in 1974, he contacted McDonald's headquarters in Illinois regarding a proposal for rights to open outlets in the Philippines. Yang's proposals were initially ignored, though he continued to remind the company regarding his business interest. In 1976, representatives of McDonald's International sent a delegation to the Philippines to conduct a feasibility study on establishing presence in the Philippine market.

McDonald's International was also considering partnering with other local firms in establishing presence in the Philippines' other than Yang. Yang sold himself as a "long term partner" and volunteered to work in British Hong Kong where he networked with the business associate of the holder of the master franchise in the city and worked with uniformed crew at an outlet in Kowloon. In 1980, McDonald's decided to award the master franchise to Yang and, shortly thereafter, set up the first Filipino McDonald's outlet along Morayta Street, within the University Belt area in Sampaloc, Manila the following year.

Entry and expansion

McDonald's entered the Philippine market in 1981 with McDonald's International partnering with McGeorge Food Industries of Filipino of Yang due to prohibition of majority foreign ownership in the country. This gave Yang's firm exclusive rights to manage operations of McDonald's in the Philippines. By the 1990s, there were already 375 McDonald's outlets in the Philippines, with around 150 operated as local franchises.

In the mid-1980s, multinational fast food chains based abroad with presence in the Philippines began to introduce food items meant for the local market. During this time, McDonald's Philippines began to introduce meals served with steam rice, spaghetti and chicken.

In 1991–1992, McDonald's expanded its reach to Visayas and Mindanao with the opening of non-Luzon outlets in Bacolod, Cebu City and Cagayan de Oro, respectively. In 1996, George Yang launched the Ronald McDonald House Charities in the country.

In 2005, the company concluded its deal with the American management as the Philippine division of McDonald's became a 100% Filipino-owned company when Golden Arches Corporation teamed up with Alliance Global Group Inc., a company owned by businessman Andrew Tan, to buy the remaining stake owned by McDonald's Corporation in its local division.

In 2018, McDonald's Philippines introduced NXTGEN, bringing self-ordering kiosks, modernized menu boards, card payment acceptance, split counter system, and with the specially trained Guest Experience Leaders to the country. It opened its flagship NXTGEN branch at McKinley West in Fort Bonifacio, Taguig, Metro Manila on October 5.

In 2020, McDonald's Philippines closed down 30 stores after lease expirations and some concerns with financial sustainability, but opened 16 new stores despite the COVID-19 pandemic. In April 2021, it launched its first Green & Good store, which uses eco-friendly and promotes eco-sustainability, at UN Avenue corner Del Pilar Street in Ermita, Manila. On December 23, 2022, it opened its 700th store in Nuvali, Santa Rosa, Laguna.

Products

McDonald's Philippines maintains a menu catered towards the Filipino market. Among these items are: 
The McSpaghetti, a sweet tomato pasta with Frankfurter bits introduced in 1986. 
The Chicken McDo, a meal of fried chicken, steamed rice and gravy was introduced in 1987, and the Burger McDo was introduced in 1993.

In 2018–2019, they offered two limited edition burgers from McDonald's Japan, the Ebi Shrimp burger and the Teriyaki Samurai burger, under the collective named "Flavors of Japan" in the country. It also includes the Nori Shake Shake Fries and a Strawberry Sakura McFloat to their menu.

Competitors
Jollibee of the Jollibee Foods Corporation, is often referred as the McDonald's Philippines primary competitor. The Philippine fast food industry is led by Jollibee, with McDonald's placing second with The Economist in 2002 noting the Philippines as one of the few markets where McDonald's isn't the leading fast food chain.

Other policies
In 2013, McDonald's Philippines stated that it was not considering acquiring other brands or entering the Philippine Stock Exchange.

References

External links

McDonald's subsidiaries
Fast-food chains of the Philippines
Food and drink companies established in 1981
Philippine companies established in 1981
Philippine subsidiaries of foreign companies
Companies based in Makati